Pilot Mound is an unincorporated community recognized as a local urban district that also once held town status in the Canadian province of Manitoba. It is located within the Municipality of Louise, approximately 60 km west of the City of Morden.

Geography

Climate

History
Pilot Mound takes its name from a mound of shale that rises above the landscape. The "old mound" as it's called served as a pilot for early fur traders, settlers and explorers. Originally settled in 1878, Pilot Mound moved to its present location in 1885 to get closer to the Canadian Pacific Railway line that moved through the area. Notable landmarks in the Pilot Mound area include the stone bank vault, used to store land titles documents. A Manitoba Pool Elevator stood in Pilot Mound and was in operation from 1957 until 2000, when it was closed down by Agricore. The building was later demolished in 2003. The Pilot Mound school district was established in 1880. A two story school known as "Big Red" was used as the main school until 1905, when a new brick school was built in the town. The brick school stood until 1959, when it was replaced with a new structure known as the Pilot Mound Consolidated School. From 1960 and on, this school served as the main school in the area, consolidating the former country schools.

Demographics 

Sports 
Pilot Mound is home to the Pilot Mound Pilots ice hockey team who play in the Tiger Hills Hockey League. The community was a finalist in CBC Television's Kraft Hockeyville competition in 2008.

Notable people
Thomas Bellamy, politician
Delaney Collins, hockey player
Jim Collins (curler), Brier-winning curler
Edward Dow, politician
Paul Hiebert, writer
Black Jack Stewart, Hockey Hall of Famer
Nolan Thiessen, Tim Hortons Brier champion
Riley Weselowski, professional hockey player

References

External links 

Pilot Mound website

Designated places in Manitoba
Former towns in Manitoba
Local urban districts in Manitoba
Pembina Valley Region
Populated places disestablished in 2015
2015 disestablishments in Manitoba